Bombay Steam Navigation Company was the first Indian-owned shipping company. It was founded by Ismail Hasham, a Kutchi Memon. 

The company operated passenger ferry and cargo services along the Konkan coast of India. In 1952, it was amalgamated with The Scindia Steam Navigation Company Limited.

Ships 

At various times, Bombay Steam Navigation Company owned and operated the following ships- 

 SS Mandovi (An 1886 built 218 Gross registered tons cargo ship, she was lost in the English channel in the same year as her built) 
The Bhima was lost in 1866 on a voyage from Bombay to Suez) 
 SS Brahmani (Built by Aisa shipbuilding Scotland in 1891, the Brahmani was a steam cargo ship of 1015 GRT. In 1900, she sank following a collision near Karwar, en route from Mangalore to Bombay) 
 SS Godavari (A 182 GRT 1884 built cargo ship, the Godavari ran aground in 1910) 
 SS Mozaffari (The Mozaffari was among the first Indian registered ships of Bombay steam navigation. Built in 1882 by Schlesinger Davis & Co. - Wallsend, the Mozaffari was acquired by the company in 1896. She ran aground and was wrecked in 1910 when entering Mozambique on a voyage from ports in East Africa to Bombay) 
 MV Dipavati (A diesel propelled passenger ship of 840 GRT, built in 1936 in Scotland, she capsized while at anchor off Bombay in 1948)

List of proprietors 
In chronological order: 
 Ismail Hasham (founder)
 Ismail Yusuf (son of Ismail Hasham)
 (Sir) Mohamed Yusuf (son of Ismail Yusuf)
 Abdul Rahaman Yusuf (eldest son of Mohamed Yusuf)

References

External links 
 List of ships owned by the Bombay Steamship Company

Defunct shipping companies of India